The Bani Shehr, known today as al-Shehri, is a tribe from the southern part of the Kingdom of Saudi Arabia.  It belongs to the ancient tribe Al-Azd that has many clans linked to it.  As far as ancestry goes, Bani Shehr, Bani Amr, Bal-Ahmar, Bal-Asmar, Bal-Qarn, Shumran and some others all belong to "Al-Azd". Al-Azd tribes had migrated after "Marib Dam" collapsed for the third time in the third century AD.

Al-Namas, Tanumah, Almajarda and some parts of Tuhama are the locations of Bani-Shehr.  The population of the clan is distributed between those places.

Ancestors

Bani Shehr tribes are branching from   Al-Azd Tribe, and they are affiliated to their top grandfather   (Shehr Ibn Rabi'a Ibn Aws Ibn Hinu Ibn Al-Azd Ibn Al-Ghoth Ibn Nabit Ibn Malik bin Zaid Ibn Kahlan Ibn Saba'a (Sheba) Ibn Yashjub Ibn Yarab Ibn Qahtan Ibn Hud (prophet) (Eber).)

Al-Azd tribes are branching from the Arabs forefather Qahtan.

Ibn Kathir has mentioned Al-Azd in his book (Al Bidayah wa-Nihayah)
"The Beginning and the End" and said that they had reached the summit of glory, and honor its peak, and the history has maintained and noted their glory, they are the owners of two paradises, 1st paradise: they owned the Kingdom of Saba'a Sheba before Islam, and the 2nd paradise: they're the masters of the Arabs and kings after their migration from Yemen and dispersed throughout the Arabian Peninsula. After the Islamic prophet Muhammad's mission was to them in Islam and the status of a great gesture honest, as are the first Arab tribes believe in Muhammad, and endorsement of his letter, and they help him with their money and themselves. They are the owners of the Islamic conquests in honorable positions in raising the banner of monotheism and the spread of Islam in the corners of the earth, and many of them were/are scholars and poets who influenced in the Arab and Islamic culture.

Brief of Bani Shehr battles against The Ottoman Empire

In the 1207 the Prince Gurm bin Saeed al-Shehri led armies to fight Turkish troops  repulsed the attack of the country of Ghamed and Zahran, they said many were killed from the tribe of (Asir) 800 men in that battle.
On Sunday, 18/6/1224 H Prince Mohammed Bin Dahman al-Shehri with his tribe the tribe of Bani Shehr attended and appeared in the army of (50) thousand fighters, and made the valley near the (Beech) to fight the Abu Sharif Hammoud, governor of nail Almikhlaf Al-Sulimani, and a fierce battle took place over defeat of the army Abu Sharif In October, army of Mohammed Ali Pasha, in charge of the Caliph of Turkey, where they surrounded (Boukruk Bin Alas) and his tribe Zahran in the Valley, and when Prince Mohammed Bin Dahman al-Shehri with his tribe army of (20) thousand occurred interim near Fort Boukroch a tough fight and defeated the Turks and Egyptians defeat the heinous and looted down their arms and their tents and killed many of the Turkish army did not survive only escaped on horseback. Hussein bin Ali Sharif of Mecca
In 1225 e equipped with the Turks a campaign against the tribe of Bani Shehr order to deter sent Prince Mohammed Bin Dahman al-Shehri son, the knight and hero (Nasser), a huge army of Bani Shehr confronted the Turkish troops in the Battle of (Otanin) (Northern Namas) and were able to expel the Turks, and made them disappointed defeated.

See also
Bani Buhair

References

Tribes of Arabia
Azd